Gurghiu may refer to several places in Romania:

Gurghiu (river), a river in Mureș County
Gurghiu Mountains
Gurghiu, Mureș, a commune in Mureș County